Blerim Krasniqi (born 5 July 1996) is an Albanian professional footballer who plays as a forward for Romanian club CS Mioveni.

Club career

Besa
Krasniqi was born into a Kosovo Albanian family that had settled in his hometown of Kavajë, which is where he started his football career at the youth team of local club Besa at the age of 14 in 2010. He made his senior league debut for the club on 11 May 2013 in a 1–1 away draw with Bylis, entering in the final 15 minutes in place of Didmar Duro. He scored his first league goal for the club on 1 November 2014 in a 3–1 away loss to Iliria. His goal, the first of the match, came in the 16th minute.

Apolonia
On 3 September 2015, Krasniqi moved to Kategoria e Parë club Apolonia by signing for an undisclosed fee. He made his league debut for the club nine days later in a 3–2 home loss against KS Pogradeci. He scored his first league goal for the club on 17 October 2015 versus Elbasani, netting the temporally equalizer in 70th minute in an eventual 2–1 home win.

Skënderbeu
With 6 months remained in his contract with Apolonia, Krasniqi signed a pre-contract with Skënderbeu to join the club in Summer transfers window. Later on, the Skënderbeu's coach Ilir Daja was looking forward for a striker to compete with Ali Sowe and convinced the club to approach him for the winter transfers window. On 8 January 2018 Krasniqi gave the club last goodbye to join Skënderbeu the following day. Skënderbeu paid €15,000 to Apolonia and both clubs agreed that the later would keep 20% of his card. Then the following day Krasniqi went to Antalya, Turkey where the club was in preparatory stage and signed a 3.5 year contract.

Krasniqi made his league debut for the club on 26 January 2018 in a 2–0 away loss to Luftëtari. He was subbed on for Emiljano Vila in the 85th minute. His first score-sheet contribution came later on 4 March during the 4–0 home win over Laçi, with Krasniqi scoring the fourth of the match in 84th minute, just eight minutes after he had been subbed on.

He played 9 league appearances during the second part of 2017–18 season as Skënderbeu won the championship for the 7th time in the last 8 seasons, marking Krasniqi's first silverware. In 2017–18 Albanian Cup, he made 3 appearances as substitute, but did not play in the final, in which the team won 1–0 to Laçi for their first ever trophy. The success also meant that Skënderbeu had completed the domestic double for the first time in history.

Krasniqi was projected as a starter in the lineup by the newly appointed manager Orges Shehi ahead of 2018–19 season following the departure of Ali Sowe. He began the season by playing full-90 minutes in the 2018 Albanian Supercup match against Laçi, being a constant threat to the opposite defenders as the team won 3–2 at Elbasan Arena. His performance was goodly received by the media. He opened his scoring account for the 2018–19 season on 17 September in the 2–0 win at Flamurtari.

Mioveni
On 19 August 2022, Krasniqi joined Liga I club Mioveni.

International career
Krasniqi received his first Albania under-21s call up by coach Alban Bushi for a gathering between 14–17 May 2017 with most of the players selected from Albanian championship.

Career statistics

Club

Honours
Skënderbeu
 Kategoria Superiore: 2017–18
 Albanian Cup: 2017–18
 Albanian Supercup: 2018

Teuta
 Kategoria Superiore: 2020–21
 Albanian Supercup: 2020

References

External links

1996 births
Living people
Albanian people of Kosovan descent
Footballers from Kavajë
Albanian footballers
Association football forwards
Albania youth international footballers
Besa Kavajë players
KF Apolonia Fier players
KF Skënderbeu Korçë players
KF Teuta Durrës players
Kategoria Superiore players
Kategoria e Parë players
Liga I players
CS Mioveni players
Football Superleague of Kosovo players
SC Gjilani players
Albanian expatriate footballers
Expatriate footballers in Kosovo
Albanian expatriate sportspeople in Kosovo
Expatriate footballers in Romania
Albanian expatriate sportspeople in Romania